St. Laurence Church, Norwell is a parish church in the Church of England in Norwell, Nottinghamshire.

The church is Grade I listed by the Department for Digital, Culture, Media and Sport as a building of outstanding architectural or historic interest.

History
The church is medieval but was heavily restored between 1874 and 1875 by Ewan Christian.

Stained glass

There are stained glass windows by Charles Eamer Kempe.

Pipe Organ

The church has a pipe organ by James Binns of Leeds. A specification of the organ can be found on the National Pipe Organ Register.

Current parish status
It is in a group of parishes which includes:
St. Andrew's Church, Caunton
St. Giles' Church, Cromwell
Holy Rood Church, Ossington
St. Laurence Church, Norwell

Sources

Church of England church buildings in Nottinghamshire
Grade I listed churches in Nottinghamshire